Shen Dingyi (1883 - August 1928); born in Yaqian (Xiaoshan), a 1920s-era Chinese revolutionary and intellectual who belonged to both the Kuomintang and the Communist Party of China. In 1921, in his home village of Yaqian (Zhejiang province), he organized hundreds of thousands peasants in a reformist association fighting for a 30% cut in land allowance. Some sinologists regard him as one of the forerunners of Mao Zedong. An undisciplined member of the Kuomintang, he was mysteriously assassinated in 1928.

References

Schoppa, R. Keith. Blood Road: The Mystery of Shen Dingyi in Revolutionary China. Berkeley: University of California Press, 1995.

1883 births
1928 deaths
Assassinated Chinese people
Chinese revolutionaries
Delegates to the 4th National Congress of the Chinese Communist Party
Politicians from Hangzhou
Republic of China politicians from Zhejiang